The Departmental Council of Côtes-d'Armor is the deliberative assembly of the Côtes-d'Armor department in the region of Brittany. It consists of 54 members (general councilors) from 27 cantons and its headquarters are in Saint-Brieuc.

The President of the council is Christian Coail.

Vice-Presidents 
The President of the Departmental Council is assisted by 12 vice-presidents chosen from among the departmental advisers. Each of them has a delegation of authority.

References 

Côtes-d'Armor
Côtes-d'Armor